The 2018–19 Syed Mushtaq Ali Trophy was the tenth season of the Syed Mushtaq Ali Trophy, a Twenty20 cricket tournament in India. It was contested by the 37 domestic cricket teams of India, with seven teams in Group D. The group stage started on 21 February 2019, with the top two teams progressing to the Super League section of the competition.

Karnataka won the group, with Bengal finishing second to progress to the Super League phase of the tournament.

Points table

Fixtures

Round 1

Round 2

Round 3

Round 4

Round 5

Round 6

Round 7

References

Syed Mushtaq Ali Trophy
Syed Mushtaq Ali Trophy
Syed Mushtaq Ali